Pocahontas is an unincorporated community located in northern Hinds County, Mississippi on U.S. Route 49. Pocahontas has a ZIP code 39072.

History
Pocahontas was founded in the 1880s, and named after Pocahontas, the Native American Indian woman. Pocahontas is located on the Canadian National Railway.

Two sites in Pocahontas are listed on the National Register of Historic Places: Pocahontas Mounds and Sub Rosa.

Notable person
 Gene Porter, jazz musician

References

Unincorporated communities in Hinds County, Mississippi
Unincorporated communities in Mississippi
Mississippi placenames of Native American origin